Idris Ali (born 24 December 1956; known by his stage name Ilias Kanchan) is a Bangladeshi actor and activist. He appeared in more than 350 films during the 1980s and 1990s. He earned Bangladesh National Film Award for Lifetime Achievement (2021), Bangladesh National Film Award for Best Actor for his role in the film Parineeta (1986) and Best Supporting Actor  for Shasti (2005). He is a road safety activist in Bangladesh. He was awarded Ekushey Padak for his social service by the Government of Bangladesh in 2018. He is the current President of Bangladesh Film Artists' Association.

Early life
Kanchan was born in Ashutipara, Karimganj, Kishoreganj to Abdul Ali and Shorufa Khatun. He completed his higher secondary degree from Kabi Nazrul Government College in 1975. He graduated from the University of Dhaka from Department of Sociology.

Career
Kanchan debuted his acting career in 1977 through his performance in the film Boshundhora directed by Subhash Dutta. In 2015, he acted in a children's film Ghuri, produced by Cinevision Bangladesh and written and directed by filmmaker Zafar Firoze.

On 28 January 2022, Kanchan became the president of Bangladesh Film Artists' Association for 2022–24 term after getting 191 votes. His rival, Misha Sawdagor, got 148 votes.

Personal life
Kanchan's first wife, Jahanara Kanchan, died in a road accident on 22 October 1993. He himself has survived a road accident in 1989. He then established a social movement Nirapad Sarak Chai (We Demand Safe Road). In 2017, the Government of Bangladesh declared October 22 as the National Road Safety Day. Together they had a daughter, Israt Jahan Ima, and a son, Mirajul Moin Joy. Kanchan later married actress Parveen Sultana Diti which ended in divorce.

Filmography

Television 
 Obanchito
 Charulota
 Nijhum Aronno
 Thandar kanddo
 Bachar boro shadh cilo
 Lal golap
 Othocho
 Tuccho
 Moronottom

Awards

 Bangladesh National Film Award for Best Actor (1986)
 Bachsas Award
 Zia Gold Award
 Sher-e-Bangla Smriti Padak
 Chalachitra Darshak Award
 Bangladesh Journalist Welfare Association award
 National Journalist Welfare Sangstha award
 Dhaka City Corporation Nagar Padak
 Nivetha Singapore Award
 Voyage of America Award
 Bangladesh Cultural Movement award
 Dhaka Juba Foundation Award

References

External links
 

Living people
1956 births
Bangladeshi male film actors
Best Actor National Film Award (Bangladesh) winners
Bangladeshi activists
Recipients of the Ekushey Padak
Best Supporting Actor National Film Award (Bangladesh) winners
National Film Award (Bangladesh) for Lifetime Achievement recipients
People from Kishoreganj District